Thirukkalyana Ekanai was an important part in Akilathirattu Ammanai the religious book of Ayyavazhi, in which Lord Vaikundar unified all the atmans (souls) of this universe into himself.

See also 
 Ayyavazhi mythology
 List of Ayyavazhi-related articles

Ayyavazhi philosophical concepts
Ayya Vaikundar